Aziz Mirza (born 15 August 1947) is an Indian film director, producer and screenwriter known for his works in Bollywood and Indian television.

Background
Mirza was born the son of bollywood script-writer Akhtar Mirza. He is a brother of the film maker Saeed Mirza (of Salim Langde Pe Mat Ro and Naseem fame)

Career
Mirza started his career in 1985 when he joined his brother Saeed Mirza and veteran director Kundan Shah to set a new production company called Iskra. He made his directional debut with the 1989 television serial Circus starring Ashutosh Gowariker and Shahrukh Khan, who was a newcomer actor at the time. Since then, he has collaborated with Shah Rukh Khan and Juhi Chawla in every alternate project in his career.

He made his film debut with Raju Ban Gaya Gentleman (1992) starring Khan and Chawla. The movie was inspired by Raj Kapoor's classic comedy Shree 420 (1955). His next project, Yes Boss (1997) starring Aditya Pancholi, Shah Rukh Khan and Juhi Chawla did fairly well at the box office.

In 1999, Mirza set up a production company called Dreamz Unlimited with Juhi Chawla and Shah Rukh Khan. Their first movie Phir Bhi Dil Hai Hindustani (2000) was directed by Mirza. In 2003 Mirza directed the third film out of Dreamz Unlimited, Chalte Chalte starring Shah Rukh Khan and Rani Mukerji in lead roles. The film was the first box office hit from this production house. After this he took a hiatus from film directing due to the death of his wife. In 2007, Mirza returned to directing and has released his next film titled Kismat Konnection which became a flop in 2008 and boasted of stars like Shahid Kapoor and Vidya Balan in lead roles.

Filmography

Television

References

External links

Living people
Indian television directors
Hindi-language film directors
Indian Muslims
Filmfare Awards winners
1947 births
20th-century Indian film directors
21st-century Indian film directors